Daŭhinava (Dolginovo;) is a village in the Vileyka District, Minsk Region, Belarus. Between the two World Wars it was part of the Wilno Voivodeship of Poland.

Jewish life in Daŭhinava 
There were 1,194 Jews in Daŭhinava in 1847, 2,559 in 1897 out of a total population of 3,551 (based on statistical analysis of the 1897 All Russia Census, for the Vileyka district town of Dolginovo), 2,259 in 1900 and 1,747  in 1921  (out of 2,671). See the  Dolhinow yizkor book for additional information. Rabbi Yaakov Yitzchok Ruderman was born in Daŭhinava, and his cousin Rabbi Yaakov Kamenetsky grew up in the town.

External references
Dolhinov Yizkor Book
Photos of Dolhinov at Radzima.org
Dolhinov data page
Belarus travel guide

Populated places in Minsk Region
Vileyka District
Vilnius Voivodeship
Vileysky Uyezd
Wilno Voivodeship (1926–1939)